S210 may refer to :
 S-210, a 1969 single stage Japanese sounding rocket
 Coolpix S210, a Nikon Coolpix series digital camera